The Bolshoy Khapton is a mountain range in Bauntovsky District, Buryatia, Russia.

The nearest airport is Bagdarin Airport.

Geography
This mountain range is located in the northeastern part of the Vitim Plateau. It stretches from southwest to northeast for almost 50 km between the Kapylyushi lake group and the southern shores of Baunt lake. The Bolshoy Khapton range is part of the watershed of the Tsipikan and Upper Tsipa rivers. In its eastern section it reaches a maximum width of 10 km.

 to the south, across the Tsipikan River, rises the smaller Maly Khapton range, highest point . It runs parallel to the Bolshoy Khapton at the southern limit of the Baunt Depression.

See also
List of mountains and hills of Russia

References

External links

^Morphological, ecological and mtDNA sequence variation in coregonid fish from the Baunt Lake system (the Vitim River basin)
Mountain ranges of Russia
Mountains of Buryatia
South Siberian Mountains